Gauri Shankar may refer to:
Gauri Shankar Rai (10 June 1924 – 2 May 1991) was a member of the 6th Lok Sabha during 1977-79 representing Ghazipur constituency of Uttar Pradesh.
Gauri Shankar Pandey, was a veteran Indian politician and a former Minister of Bihar.
Gauri Shankar (chess player) (born 1 October 1992) is an Indian chess  player who is currently a FIDE Master.
Gauri Shankar Kalita (1955 - 9 June 2010) was an Indian journalist.
Gauri Shankar Khadka is a Nepalese politician, belonging to the Communist Party of Nepal (Maoist).
Gauri Shankar Chaudhary is a Nepalese Politician, former agriculture minister.